West Virginia is a state located in the Southern United States. There are 232 municipalities.

Cities
The following is a list of cities in West Virginia, arranged by population.

Towns
List of towns in West Virginia, arranged in alphabetical order.

A
Albright
Alderson
Anawalt
Anmoore
Ansted
Athens
Auburn

B
Bancroft
Barrackville
Bath (Berkeley Springs)
Bayard
Belington
Belle
Bethany
Beverly
Blacksville
Bolivar
Bradshaw
Bramwell
Brandonville
Bruceton Mills
Buffalo
Burnsville

C
Cairo
Camden-on-Gauley
Capon Bridge
Carpendale
Cedar Grove
Chapmanville
Chesapeake
Clay
Clendenin
Cowen

D
Danville
Davis
Davy
Delbarton
Durbin

E
East Bank
Eleanor
Elizabeth
Elk Garden
Ellenboro

F
Fairview
Falling Spring
Farmington
Fayetteville
Flatwoods
Flemington
Fort Gay
Franklin
Friendly

G
Gassaway
Gauley Bridge
Gilbert
Glasgow
Glenville
Grant Town
Grantsville
Granville

H
Hambleton
Hamlin
Handley
Harman
Harpers Ferry
Harrisville
Hartford City
Hedgesville
Henderson
Hendricks
Hillsboro
Hundred
Huttonsville

I
Iaeger

J
Jane Lew
Junior

K
Kermit
Kimball

L
Leon
Lester
Lost Creek
Lumberport

M
Mabscott
Man
Marlinton
Mason
Masontown
Matewan
Matoaka
Meadow Bridge
Middlebourne
Mill Creek
Milton
Mitchell Heights
Monongah
Montrose
Moorefield

N
New Haven
Newburg
North Hills
Northfork
Nutter Fort

O
Oakvale
Oceana

P
Paw Paw
Pax
Peterstown
Piedmont
Pine Grove
Pineville
Poca
Pratt
Pullman

Q
Quinwood

R
Rainelle
Reedsville
Reedy
Ridgeley
Rivesville
Rowlesburg
Rupert

S
Sand Fork
Shepherdstown
Smithfield
 Spencer 
Sophia
Star City
Sutton
Sylvester

T
Terra Alta
Thurmond
Triadelphia
Tunnelton

U
Union

W
Wardensville
Wayne
Webster Springs (Addison)
West Hamlin
West Liberty
West Logan
West Milford
West Union
White Hall
Whitesville
Williamstown
Winfield
Womelsdorf (Coalton)
Worthington

Former towns
These communities were once towns but disincorporated.
Dunlow
East Lynn
Jefferson
Littleton
Rhodell

Villages
List of villages in West Virginia, arranged in alphabetical order.
Barboursville
Beech Bottom
Bethlehem
Clearview  
Colliers
Valley Grove
Windsor Heights

See also
West Virginia
List of towns in West Virginia
List of villages in West Virginia
List of census-designated places in West Virginia

References

 
West Virginia
Cities